Zamyany is a rural locality (a selo) and the administrative center of Zamyansky Selsoviet of Yenotayevsky District, Astrakhan Oblast, Russia. The population was 1,494 as of 2010. There are 32 streets.

Geography 
Zamyany is located 76 km southeast of Yenotayevka (the district's administrative centre) by road. Pribrezhny is the nearest rural locality.

References 

Rural localities in Yenotayevsky District